Culture and Heritage may refer to:

 Culture and Heritage Directorate of the Scottish Government, see Strategy and External Affairs Directorates
 Ministry for Culture and Heritage, a government agency within the New Zealand government

See also
 Ministry of Heritage and Culture, Oman
 Culture
 Cultural heritage